Duaij bin Salman bin Ahmed bin Mohammed bin Isa Al Khalifa is a Bahraini soldier who currently holds the position of Chief of Staff of the Bahrain Defence Force.

Career
He was born in Muharraq in 1953. He holds a diploma in military science and has taken specialized courses on Special Forces and paratrooper operations and on counterterrorism. After finishing officer training, he took over the Special Forces in 1988.

Medals
 Isa bin Salman Al Khalifa Award
 Bahrain Medal, Second Class
 Bahrain Medal, Third Class
 Military Service Medal, First Class
 Military Duty Medal
 Kuwait Liberation Medal
 Dialogue Medal, First Class

Personal life	
D’aij has two sons and four daughters:
 Khaled
 Ahmed
 Nouf
 Lulwa
 Naila
 Mai

References

Bahraini military personnel
1953 births
House of Khalifa
Living people
People from Muharraq